John Hawkin (fl. 1397–1406), of Huntingdon and Great Gidding, Huntingdonshire, was an English politician.

He was a Member (MP) of the Parliament of England for Huntingdon in 1397, 1399 and 1406.

References

14th-century births
15th-century deaths
English MPs September 1397
Members of the Parliament of England (pre-1707) for constituencies in Huntingdonshire
English MPs 1399
English MPs 1406